St. Paul High School was a Catholic high school established in 1927 in Grosse Pointe Farms, Michigan, United States.

References

Private high schools in Michigan
Defunct Catholic secondary schools in Michigan